Baseball was contested at the 1990 Central American and Caribbean Games in Mexico City, Mexico.

References
 

1990 Central American and Caribbean Games
1990
1990
Central American and Caribbean Games